The "Pegmantit 8" or P-8 (also referred to by the NATO reporting name "Knife Rest A" in the west) was an early 2D VHF radar developed and operated by the former Soviet Union.

Development
The "Pegmantit 8", which is abbreviated to P-8, was a development of one of the first early warning and ground control radars to be developed by the former Soviet Union, the P-3 radar. The radar was developed and successfully tested between 1949 and 1950, demonstrating a detection range of 150 km against a target aircraft at 8 km altitude and was accepted into operational service. The P-8 was developed by the SKB Design Bureau, a division of State Plant No.197 named after V. I. Lenin who developed the previous P-3, the predecessor of the current Nizhniy Novgorod Research Institute of Radio Engineering (NNIIRT). The development of the P-8 radar won the team responsible for its introduction the state prize.

In 1951 the P-8 radar underwent a significant modification which boosted the detection range to 250 km against a target flying at an altitude of 10 km, the target detection range of low altitude targets was also improved by a factor of 60-70%. Between 1956 and 1957 the P-10 and legacy P-8 radar were equipped with improved clutter suppression equipment allowing for cancellation of clutter moving up to 30 m/s, cancellation was improved by a factor of 5 compared with no cancellation.

Description
The P-8 being a development of the earlier P-3 shares many similarities with the earlier system, like the P-3M (mobile variant) the P-8 was mounted in two ZiL trucks. The P-8 used a single antenna accomplishing both transmission and reception which rotated at a speed of 2 r.p.m. The antenna was composed of four Yagi antennas mounted in sets of two with one set above the other atop a 30-meter mast. Azimuth was scanned mechanically by the antenna with elevation determined using a goniometer in similar fashion to the P-3. The P-8 was one of the first Russian radars to incorporate a means of clutter suppression, a coherent oscillator in the receiver circuit acted as a simple moving target indicator to eliminate passive interference like ground clutter. The P-8 was also the first Russian radar to use a plan position indicator in addition to an A-scope to indicate height, the radar had a maximum power output of up to 75 kW and a receiver sensitivity of 7 mV.

Operators
The P-8 was operated by the Soviet Union from 1950 but has long since become obsolete and retired from service, replaced by more advanced models entering into service after the P-8 such as the P-10 radar.

See also
P-3 radar
P-10 radar
List of radars

External links
NNIIRT

References

Russian and Soviet military radars
Nizhny Novgorod Research Institute of Radio Engineering products
Military vehicles introduced in the 1950s